Cameron Roy Marchand Buchanan (born September 1946) is a Scottish Conservative Party politician who served as a Member of the Scottish Parliament (MSP) for the Lothian region from 2013 to 2016.

Early life and career
After studying at St Edward's School, Oxford and Sorbonne University, Buchanan worked as a textile entrepreneur and was managing director of woollen goods retailer Harrisons of Edinburgh prior to taking his seat.

Political career
Buchanan was vice-chairman of the Scottish Conservative Party while working in retail. He took up his seat after it was vacated by former Scottish Conservative leader David McLetchie due to McLetchie's death from cancer in August 2013.

Personal life
Buchanan lives in Edinburgh with his wife, Emma, who is a teacher.

Notes

References

External links 
 

1946 births
Living people
Conservative MSPs
Members of the Scottish Parliament 2011–2016
Scottish businesspeople